Koihoma  (Coixoma), also known ambiguously as Coto (Koto) and Orejone (Orejón), neither its actual name, is an extinct, apparently Witotoan language of Peru.

In popular culture 
In Steven Spielberg's film Indiana Jones and the Kingdom of the Crystal Skull (2008), Indiana Jones identifies Koihoma language on a mysterious letter written by Harold Oxley, although he explains to Mutt Williams that nobody speaks that language anymore. He quite contradictorily defines it a "Latin American language" that became extinct centuries before Spanish and Portuguese were introduced to the Americas.

References

Bora–Witoto languages
Extinct languages of South America
Languages of Peru
Languages attested from the 1850s